Dominga is a copper and iron ore prospect and mine project in northern Chile. The ores of Dominga are emplaced in volcanic and plutonic rocks of the Punta del Cobre Formation and the "Dioritic Complex" respectively. The Dominga mine project has been controversial because of an alleged conflict of interest involving former president Sebastián Piñera and Carlos Alberto Délano a local magnate and friend of Piñera. The purchase deal of Dominga included a clause for the last payment to be done only if no new environmental protection area was created near the mine, leading to a conflict of interest for Piñera. The details of the agreement became only known with the Pandora Papers in 2021.

The project has also been criticized on environmental grounds because it is claimed to threaten the nearby Pingüino de Humboldt National Reserve.

References

Geology of Coquimbo Region
Mines in Coquimbo Region
Copper mines in Chile
Iron ore mines in Chile
Surface mines in Chile